Ixil may refer to
 Ixil language, a Mayan language spoken in Guatemala
 Ixil people, an indigenous Maya people in El Quiché Department, Guatemala
 Ixil Community, a region encompassing three Ixil villages in the western Guatemalan highlands
 Ixil Municipality, a town in Yucatán, Mexico

Language and nationality disambiguation pages